Pribislav, Przibislaus (from Slavic пробивающая слава, "pribi" – pierced, breaking or "more, much more" and "slav" - glory) is a Slavic origin name. Its feminine form is Pribislava.

Notable bearers of the name include:
Pribislaw I, Lord of Parchim-Richenberg
Pribislaw II, son of the above, Lord of Białogard
Pribislav (Hevelli prince) (1075–1150), also known as Pribislav-Henry
Pribislav (Wagrian prince) (died after 1156), Obotrite prince
Pribislav of Mecklenburg (died 1178), Obotrite prince and first Prince of Mecklenburg
Pribislav of Serbia (ruled 891–892), Prince of the Serbs

See also

 Slavic names
 Przybysław (disambiguation)
 Přibyslav
 Pribislavec, a village

Slavic masculine given names
Serbian masculine given names